Geographic Practice Cost Index is used along with Relative Value Units by Medicare to determine allowable payment amounts for medical procedures. There are multiple GPCIs: Cost of Living, Malpractice, and Practice Cost/Expense. These categories allow Medicare to adjust reimbursement rates to take into account regional and practice-specific factors.

An example calculation for a Medicare allowed amount is:

2009 Non-Facility Pricing Amount = [(Work RVU * Work GPCI) + (Transitioned Non-Facility PE RVU * PE GPCI) + (MP RVU * MP GPCI)] * Conversion Factor (CF)

See also
Medicare Sustainable Growth Rate

References

External links
 PlexisWeb Glossary Definition
 Physician Fee Schedule Overview, Centers for Medicare & Medicaid Services

Medicare and Medicaid (United States)